Venant Ntabomvura was born on 4 April 1926. He was the first registered student at the National University of Rwanda in 1963.  He started medical practice in 1946 and retired at 88 years old.

He was Rector for University of Rwanda for the period 1981 to 1984.

References

 
History of Rwanda
1926 births
Possibly living people